Minuscule 456 (in the Gregory-Aland numbering), α 52 (in the Soden numbering), is a Greek minuscule manuscript of the New Testament, on parchment. Palaeographically it has been assigned to the 10th century. 
Formerly it was labelled by 86a, 96p, and 75r.
Marginalia are incomplete. The manuscript was prepared for liturgical use.

Description 

The codex contains the text of the Acts of the Apostles, Catholic epistles, Pauline epistles, and Book of Revelation on 244 parchment leaves. The last leaf of the Book of Revelation was added in the 16th century.

The text is written in two columns per page, in 32 lines per page.

The order of books: Acts, Catholic epistles, Pauline epistles (Philemon placed before Hebrews), and Book of Revelation.

Text 
Kurt Aland the Greek text of the codex did not place in any Category.

In Romans 8:1 it reads Ιησου κατα σαρκα περιπατουσιν αλλα κατα πνευμα, for Ιησου. The reading of the manuscript is supported by אc, Dc, K, P, 33, 88, 104, 181, 326, 330, (436 omit μη), 614, 630, 1241, 1877, 1962, 1984, 1985, 2492, 2495, Byz, Lect.

History 

The manuscript was examined and slightly collated by Birch and Scholz. Antonio Maria Biscioni published its facsimile in 1752. Hoskier collated text of the Apocalypse.

Formerly it was labelled by 86a, 96p, and 75r. C. R. Gregory saw it in 1886. In 1908 Gregory gave the number 456 to it.

It is currently housed at the Laurentian Library (Plutei IV. 30) in Florence.

See also 

 List of New Testament minuscules
 Biblical manuscript
 Textual criticism

References

Further reading 

 Antonio Maria Biscioni, Bibliothecae Mediceo-Laurentianae catalogus, Florence 1752, vol. 2, 70.
 Herman C. Hoskier, Concerning the Text of the Apocalypse: Collation of All Existing Available Greek Documents with the Standard Text of Stephen’s Third Edition Together with the Testimony of Versions, Commentaries and Fathers. vol. 1 (London: Bernard Quaritch, Ltd., 1929), pp. 240–245.

External links 
 

Greek New Testament minuscules
10th-century biblical manuscripts